Amand-Marie-Jacques de Chastenet, Marquis de Puységur  (1751–1825) was a French magnetizer aristocrat from one of the most illustrious families of the French nobility. He is now remembered as one of the pre-scientific founders of hypnotism (a branch of animal magnetism, or Mesmerism).

The Marquis de Puységur learned about Mesmerism from his brother Antoine-Hyacinthe, the Count of Chastenet. One of his first and most important patients was Victor Race, a 23-year-old peasant in the employ of the Puységur family. Race was easily "magnetized" by Puységur, but displayed a strange form of sleeping trance not before seen in the early history of Mesmerism.

Puységur noted the similarity between this sleeping trance and natural sleep-walking or somnambulism, and he named it "artificial somnambulism". Today we know similar states by the name "hypnosis", although that term was invented much later by James Braid in 1842. Some characteristics of Puysegur's artificial somnambulism were in any case specific of his method.

Puységur rapidly became a highly successful magnetist, to whom people came from all over France. In 1785, Puységur taught a course in animal magnetism to the local Masonic society, which he concluded with these words:

Puységur's institute for training in animal magnetism, Société Harmonique des Amis Réunis, grew rapidly until the Revolution in 1789. During the revolutionary era the institute was disbanded and Puységur spent two years in prison. After the Napoleons' overthrow, the new generation of practitioners of mesmerists (and later of hypnotists) looked to Puységur as their patriarch, and came to accept his method of inducing a sleeping trance in preference to the original methods of Mesmer. Puységur, however, always portrayed himself as a faithful disciple of Mesmer, and never took credit for having invented the procedure that is now known as hypnotic induction. His contributions were gradually forgotten, until Nobel prize-winner Charles Richet rediscovered his writings in 1884, and showed that most of what other people had claimed as their discoveries in the field of magnetism and hypnotherapy were originally due to the Marquis de Puységur.

Henri Ellenberger, the great historian of psychoanalysis and psychotherapy, wrote that Puységur was "one of the great forgotten contributors to the history of the psychological sciences." The details of the life and work of Puységur may be found in Ellenberger's book, The Discovery of the Unconscious, pp. 70–74. Ellenberger's view of Puységur was supported and amplified in Peter Sloterdijk's book Critique of Cynical Reason. In this work, Sloterdijk emphasized Puységur's contributions in his refutation of the common idea that intellectuals of the Enlightenment were not interested in the subconscious mind.

Footnotes

References 
 Gauld, A., A History of Hypnotism, Cambridge University Press, 1992.
 Harte, R., Hypnotism and the Doctors, Volume I: Animal Magnetism: Mesmer/De Puysegur, L.N. Fowler & Co., (London), 1902.

1751 births
1825 deaths
Hypnosis
Animal magnetism
Marquesses of Puységur